The Chiesa di San Polo is a Catholic church in Venice, dedicated to the Apostle Paul. It gives its name to the San Polo sestiere of the city.

Exterior 
The current Gothic church dates from the 15th century, but a church has stood on the site since the 9th century and the south doorway, possibly by Bartolomeo Bon, survives from this church. The campanile, standing detached from the church, was built in 1362.

Interior 
The interior has a ship's keel roof and was restored in 1804 by Davide Rossi. On the left wall near the entrance is a Last Supper by  Jacopo Tintoretto, while the first altarpiece on the left, is attributed to his studio.  Other walls have canvases by Paolo Piazza (St Silvester baptizes Emperor Constantine and St Paul Preaching; by Jacopo Guarana (Sacred Heart).

The altar of the absidal chapel on the left has a Marriage of the Virgin by Paolo Veronese. The presbytery has canvases by Palma il Giovane including St Peter and the Keys, the St Paul at Tarsus, and a Temptation of St Anthony Abbot). Next to the altar are two bronze statues by Alessandro Vittoria:St Paul and St Anthony Abbot.

Among the ceiling paintings are a Glory of Angels and Resurrection by Giandomenico Tiepolo. His father, Giambattista is thought to be the author of  Virgin appears to St John Nepomuk, commissioned by the King of Poland, August III.

Oratory of the Crucifix 

 VIA CRUCIS by Giandomenico Tiepolo

Other Works of Art in Church
 Giambattista Tiepolo (Virgin appearing to a Saint on the north wall of the nave)
 Gian Domenico Tiepolo (Stations of the Cross, Glory of Angels and Resurrection in the Oratory of the Crucifix)
 Veronese (Marriage of the Virgin in the north apse chapel)

External links
San Polo, Venice
Adrian Fletcher's Paradoxplace Venice Pages – San Polo (photos)

Polo
15th-century establishments in Italy
Polo
Buildings and structures completed in 1362
Towers completed in the 14th century